Hugh McIlmoyle (born 29 January 1940) is a Scottish former professional footballer who played as a centre forward for Port Glasgow and in the Football League for Leicester City, Rotherham United, Carlisle United, Wolverhampton Wanderers, Bristol City, Middlesbrough, and Preston North End and in the Scottish Football League for Greenock Morton.

References

External links 
 

1940 births
Living people
People from Port Glasgow
Scottish footballers
Association football forwards
Leicester City F.C. players
Rotherham United F.C. players
Carlisle United F.C. players
Wolverhampton Wanderers F.C. players
Bristol City F.C. players
Middlesbrough F.C. players
Preston North End F.C. players
Greenock Morton F.C. players
English Football League players
Scottish Football League players
Footballers from Inverclyde
Outfield association footballers who played in goal
FA Cup Final players